In Greek mythology, the name Canthus (Ancient Greek: Κάνθος) may refer to:

Canthus, one of the Argonauts, son of Canethus and grandson of Abas (alternately, son of Abas). He was killed by Caphaurus (or Cephalion), son of Amphithemis and Tritonis, in Libya. However, in some accounts, he was killed by Gesander during the Colchian war.
Canthus, one of the sons of Aegyptus, who married and was killed by Eurydice, daughter of Danaus.

Notes

References 
 Gaius Julius Hyginus, Fabulae from The Myths of Hyginus translated and edited by Mary Grant. University of Kansas Publications in Humanistic Studies. Online version at the Topos Text Project.
 Gaius Valerius Flaccus, Argonautica translated by Mozley, J H. Loeb Classical Library Volume 286. Cambridge, MA, Harvard University Press; London, William Heinemann Ltd. 1928. Online version at theio.com.
 Gaius Valerius Flaccus, Argonauticon. Otto Kramer. Leipzig. Teubner. 1913. Latin text available at the Perseus Digital Library.
 Pseudo-Apollodorus, The Library with an English Translation by Sir James George Frazer, F.B.A., F.R.S. in 2 Volumes, Cambridge, MA, Harvard University Press; London, William Heinemann Ltd. 1921. Online version at the Perseus Digital Library. Greek text available from the same website.

Princes in Greek mythology
Sons of Aegyptus
Argonauts
Characters in the Argonautica